Tonghua is a prefecture-level city in the south of Jilin province, People's Republic of China. It borders North Korea's Chagang Province to the south and southeast, Baishan to the east, Jilin City to the north, Liaoyuan to the northwest, and Liaoning province to the west and southwest. Its built-up (or metro) area made of the two urban districts was home to 446,917 inhabitants. It is known as one of the five medicine production centres in China.

History

Human settlement in the Tonghua area dates from about 6000 years ago. In the Western Han Dynasty, Tonghua belonged to the Liaodong Fourth Commandery.

Tonghua was the birthplace of Goguryeo culture and shaman culture. The Goguryeo kingdom established its capital at Gungnae in 425 A.D., which, together with the Tombs of the Ancient Gogoryeo Kingdom, represents the only successful, independent submission to become a UNESCO World Heritage Site.

Under the Japanese occupation of Manchuria after 1932, a railway was constructed linking Tonghua with the main Manchurian rail network and with northern Korea.

During the Second Sino-Japanese War, Yang Jingyu led the First Army of the Northeast Anti-Japanese United Army to battle the Imperial Japanese Army, and was killed in battle.

In August 1945 Tonghua briefly served as the temporary capital of Manchukuo, where Puyi claimed to abdicate at the behest of the Kwantung Army. In 1985, Tonghua became a prefecture-level city under the approval of the State Council.

Administrative divisions

Geography

Climate
Tonghua has a monsoon-influenced, humid continental climate (Köppen Dwa), with long, very cold, windy, but dry winters and hot, humid summers; spring and autumn are brief. However, the monsoon still means that more than 60% of the annual precipitation falls from June to August alone.

Economy

Traditionally, Tonghua occupied a railhub position in a region of China noted for trade in only three agricultural commodities. These were ginseng, marten furs and deer antler products. In the 1980s Tonghua had some success with a wine distillery producing sweet, sticky red wines that proved popular with local consumers. From 1987 onwards a biennial wine festival was inaugurated, but this and the industry it promoted ultimately failed commercially owing to competition with joint-venture wine companies such as Dragon, who were able to produce a product that was marketable overseas. Following this failure, Tonghua industry was thrown back on its traditional agricultural products - and a few small but viable factories, including one specialising in artificial furs.

A fledgling tourist trade sought to highlight Tonghua attractions such as some impressive ski slopes, the tomb of the local hero General Yang (a resister to the Japanese occupation of Manchukuo in the 1930s) and the beautiful Changbai Shan Nature Reserve for which Tonghua serves as a connecting railway station from the major population centres to the north and west.

Tonghua's population hovers around 300,000, but census information is difficult to assess as it includes demographic information from other towns nearby (for example, Erdaojiang - a suburb of Tonghua, and even Hunjiang, a city to the east). The inclusion of these suburbs and surrounding towns greatly swells Tonghua's official population beyond the 300,000-mark.

Steel

Erdaojiang District has a number of steelworks, and tens of thousands of steelworkers are employed locally.  In July 2009, workers at Tonghua Iron and Steel Group rioted (See main article) at news of a takeover deal by privately owned Jianlong Steel, and the general manager of the firm was beaten to death.  The unrest reportedly involved 30,000 workers, with up to 100 injured in clashes with police.  The takeover was promptly scrapped.

Tonghua Iron and Steel became part of Shougang Group in 2010, and is now called Shougang Tonghua Steel Group.

Pharmaceuticals
The city of Tonghua has also become a hub for a range of Chinese pharmaceutical firms, including domestic insulin producer Tonghua Dongbao Pharmaceuticals Ltd. These companies are generally spread among the various "Industrial parks" found throughout the city, with 46 projects located in these parks in 2012 alone. Investment in Tonghua's pharmaceutical industry is on the increase, with 27 of these projects worth over 100 million Yuan. Other pharmaceutical producers in the area include Jingma, Zhenghe and Wantong Pharmaceuticals.

Transportation

Railway
Railways from Shenyang to Jilin and Meihekou to Ji'an meets in Tonghua. Trains from Tonghua Railway Station connect the city with Beijing, Qingdao, Shenyang, Dalian and several other major cities in China.

Highway
Tonghua is served by G11 Hegang-Dalian Expressway.

Air
Tonghua is served by Tonghua Sanyuanpu Airport.

Tourism

Yang Jingyu Martyrs Cemetery 
The Yang Jingyu Martyrs Cemetery is located on the hills adjoining the Tongjiang River in Tonghua and was built to commemorate Second Sino-Japanese War war hero, Yang Jingyu. It was built in July 1954 and completed in September 1957. There are five buildings in the park, which are classical glazed tile buildings. The front is the mourning hall and the tomb. The four partial temples are the performance exhibition hall of General Yang Jingyu. The bronze statue of General Yang Jingyu erects on the central of the cemetery. The front of the granite base is engraved with Peng Zhen’s handwriting: The National Hero Yang Jingyu.

Baijifeng National Forest Park 
It is located in the southeast of Tonghua, 25 kilometers away from the urban area.

The Forest Park is dominated by natural landscapes. The main species are Korean pine, spruce, alfalfa, birch, and rare species such as yew, hedgehog, hawthorn, and magnolia. Under the canopy, there are mainly wild ginseng, ginseng, asarum and other medicinal materials.

References

External links 

 Government website of Tonghua 

 
Cities in Jilin
Prefecture-level divisions of Jilin